Phaedimus is a genus of beetles belonging to the family Scarabaeidae, subfamily Cetoniinae.

Selected species
 Phaedimus cumingi (Waterhouse, 1841)
 Phaedimus zebuanus Mikšič 1972

References
 Waterhouse G.R. (1841) Descriptions of various Coleopterous insects brought from the Philippine Islands by Mr. Cuming, Journal of Proceedings of the Entomological Society of London :26-28
 Scarabs: World Scarabaeidae Database. Schoolmeesters P.
 Biolib
 Encyclopaedia of Life

Cetoniinae